Alpaida variabilis is a species of spider known for living in wetlands.

Description 
A small spider, characterized by having hairless bodies; an orange, yellow, or red carapace, often having dark patterns.

Range 
This spider is found in Colombia and Argentina. May be found in other countries, although limited to the neotropics.

Habitat 
Found in the grass of more water dense environments such as wetlands.

References 

Araneidae
Arachnids of South America